The 2008 Danish embassy bombing was an attack on the Danish embassy in Islamabad, Pakistan on 2 June 2008. The suspected suicide car bombing in the parking lot of the embassy took place at around 12:10 pm (UTC+5), killing at least six and wounding many more. The Danish national security intelligence agency PET concluded that al-Qaeda was behind the attack. Al-Qaeda claimed responsibility for the attack on 5 June 2008. The attack was confirmed to be an answer to the reprinting of Danish newspaper Jyllands-Posten's Muhammed cartoons in February 2006, as well as the presence of Danish troops in Afghanistan.

Details

The attack
Around 12:10 pm on 2 June 2008, a stolen Toyota Corolla with a man at the wheel arrived at high speed, passing in front of the entrance of the Danish embassy, then stopping at the parking lot in front of the complex. Seconds later a suicide car bomb detonated, killing at least six and wounding several others. The events leading up to the explosion and the explosion itself was captured on tape by the embassy's video surveillance cameras, which was gathered by the PET and then handed over to Pakistani authorities as part of their criminal enquiry. The car used to bomb the embassy was able to get past heightened security because it had diplomatic registration plates.

The blast left a large crater in front of the building, as well as significant structural damage. A cloud of black smoke was reported to be visible across the city of Islamabad. A Pakistani Development Organisation building took the brunt of the blast as well as the Danish embassy. Other offices and residential building also were damaged by the car bomb. The residences of the Dutch ambassador and the Australian defense attache, located near the Danish embassy, were damaged in the blast, but none of their staff were reported injured. The blast also shattered the windowpanes of the nearby "India House", which houses India's ambassador to Pakistan. There is speculation about the composition of the bomb. Some sources states that 25 kg of explosives were used, while others states that a combination of fertilisers and diesel fuel, boosted with 5 kg of explosives were used.

The Danish government received the news of the attack at 9 o'clock in the morning, and the Danish Minister of Foreign Affairs, Per Stig Møller immediately condemned the attack on the strongest possible terms, and the Danish cabinet was subsequently called in for an emergency session. Later in the afternoon the Danish Prime Minister Anders Fogh Rasmussen followed suit and condemned the attack as well. The Norwegian and Swedish embassies were completely evacuated as a safety precaution, and Danish citizens have been advised against all travel to Pakistan, and if already in the country, to be very careful.

Fatalities
At least six people were killed and 24 wounded. According to the chargé d'affaires of the embassy in Islamabad, Michael Hjortsø, none of those killed were Danish employees of the embassy, though two victims were reported to be locals employed at the embassy, and the Danish foreign ministry announced that one victim was a Danish citizen of Pakistani origin not working at the embassy. Damage was also reported at the residence of the Indian High Commissioner.

A security guard at a nearby United Nations Development Programme building was among those killed. Six of the wounded were UNDP employees.

Threats
Prior to the explosion, the Danish Embassy had received several threats, the last as late as a month before the attack, Pakistani media reported on tribal people who threatened to travel to the Pakistani capital of Islamabad to blow up the Danish embassy there.

One and a half-month before the attack, Al-Qaeda's then-deputy, Ayman al-Zawahiri, urged Muslims to strike against Danish targets in an interview published by As-Sahab.

In the interview, published 17 April 2008 al-Zawahiri asked why he in 2003 threatened Norway, Denmark and other countries for their support for the United States and the fight against terrorism, saying: "We have threatened Norway and all other countries participating in the war against the Muslims, as part of the defence of our ideology, nation, ourselves and our sacred riter, the al-Zawahiri and continues: "Denmark has done its utmost to demonstrate its hostility against Muslims by repeatedly dishonoring the Prophet, may Allah bless him and grant him salvation. I exhort and encourage any Muslim who has the opportunity, to harm Denmark to thereby show your support for our Prophet, may Allah bless him and grant him salvation, and defend his esteemed honor."

Denmark had downgraded the embassy threat in response to perceived security threats, as well as other embassies in the Islamic world.

The perpetrators
The Danish national security intelligence agency PET concluded that the terrorist organisation Al-Qaeda was behind the attack. The possibility of either direct Al-Qaida involvement or Al-Qaeda inspired groups is high, due to the fact that the terrorist attack against the Danish embassy came a month and a half after Al-Qaeda's then-deputy, Ayman al-Zawahiri, urged Muslims to strike against Danish targets in the interview published by As-Sahab on 17 April 2008.

According to statements from the Danish Ministry of Foreign Affairs: "There are signs that as a result of the current events there is a sharpened focus on Denmark also among the leading militant extremists abroad, and that such environments have a desire to carry out terrorist acts against Denmark, as well as against the Danes and Danish interests abroad. This is especially true in areas where Al-Qaeda-related groups are active".

According to sources close to the Danish government and PET, the main suspects behind the attack were, until the proclamation made by Al-Qaeda, the Taliban. However, the Taliban denied having any role in the attack. If they had been those responsible for the attack, that would have made the second terrorist attack carried out by Taliban targeting Scandinavians; the first being the attack on Serena Hotel in Kabul on 14 January, where a Norwegian delegation under Minister of Foreign Affairs Jonas Gahr Støre, which resided at the time of the attack, was allegedly the target. Nevertheless, this is the second terrorist attack where Scandinavians had been the target.

On 5 June, an online posting attributed to Mustafa Abu al-Yazid on a jihadist website claimed that Al-Qaeda planned the attack.

Al Qaeda's chief of operations for Pakistan, Fahid Mohammed Ally Msalam was believed to have masterminded the attack. He was killed in a drone strike along with his lieutenant, Sheikh Ahmed Salim Swedan, on 1 January 2009.

Three men charged in the attack were acquitted in a Pakistani court on 25 Sep 2010.

International reactions

Countries

International organisations

See also

 List of terrorist incidents, 2008
 List of attacks on diplomatic missions
 2008 Kabul Serena Hotel attack – a terrorist attack on the Serena Hotel resided by a Norwegian delegation

References

External links
 Danish embassy in Islamabad

Photo galleries
 VG: Photo Gallery: Terrorist Attack in Islamabad

2008 murders in Pakistan
21st-century mass murder in Pakistan
Denmark–Pakistan relations
Jyllands-Posten Muhammad cartoons controversy
Danish embassy bombing
Danish Islamabad embassy
Suicide car and truck bombings in Pakistan
2008 in international relations
Danish embassy bombing
Pakistan
Terrorist incidents in Islamabad
2000s in Islamabad
Al-Qaeda attacks
Islamic terrorist incidents in 2008
Islamic terrorism in Pakistan
Building bombings in Pakistan
Anti-Danish sentiment